Agent Orange, in comics, may refer to:

 Larfleeze, a DC Comics supervillain from the Green Lantern series who uses the codename Agent Orange
 Agent Orange (Wildstorm), a character from Wildcats
 Agent Orange, a DC Comics villain who appeared in Batman and the Outsiders #3
 Agent Orange, a DC Comics character who first appeared in Swamp Thing (vol. 3) #6
 William Rawlins, a character on The Punisher who uses the name Agent Orange as a codename

See also
Agent Orange (disambiguation)

References